Gedling Town F.C. was a football club based in Gedling, near Arnold, Nottinghamshire, England. The club played in the East Midlands Counties Football League until 2011 when the club folded.

History
Gedling Town was formed 1989 and joined the Central Midlands League Division One in 1990, winning that league at their first attempt. They remained in the top division of the CML until joining the Northern Counties East League in 2000. The mid 2000s saw the club get to the fourth round of the FA Vase three times in a row. In 2008 the club became a founder member of the new East Midlands Counties Football League. The club announced its intention to resign from the East Midlands Counties League and fold in October 2010, but eventually decided to complete the season before closing down.

Honours
East Midlands Counties League
 League Cup Winners 2009–10
Central Midlands League Division One
 Champions 1990–91
Northern Counties East League Division One
 Champions 2001–02

References

Defunct football clubs in Nottinghamshire
Association football clubs established in 1989
Association football clubs disestablished in 2011
East Midlands Counties Football League
1989 establishments in England
2011 disestablishments in England
Central Midlands Football League